The Endeavour class were non-combat naval ships used by the Canadian Forces for oceanographic research.

There were at least two ships built in this class, and CFAV Quest (AGOR 172), originally HMCS Quest.

References

External links
 Endeavour-class oceanographic research ships

 
Auxiliary research ship classes